William Hogarth Tower (1871–1950), of New Jersey, USA was a postage stamp collector who endowed a "stamp room" at Princeton University.

Collecting interests
Tower created a number of stamp collections, each focused on one aspect of philately. His collections included English postal history mostly from the stampless period prior to the invention of postage stamps, as well as specialized collection of war covers and philatelic material related to Abraham Lincoln.

Philatelic activity
Tower was able to convince Princeton University to create an academic-level "stamp room" containing philatelic material such as postage stamps, cancelled covers, and other items of postal history, and he was named curator by the university. With the assistance of the Society of Philatelic Americans he was able to solicit philatelic material to be used in the stamp room.

Honors and awards
Tower was named to the American Philatelic Society Hall of Fame in 1951.

Legacy
Upon his death, Tower bequeathed his valuable collections of postage stamps and postal history item to the Princeton University Library.

References
 APS Hall of Fame – Rev. William Hogarth Tower (scroll down page)
 William Hogarth Tower collection, Princeton University

1871 births
1950 deaths
American philatelists
People from New Jersey
Princeton University people
American Philatelic Society